Nollet is a surname, and may refer to:

 Célestin Nollet (1894-1975), Belgian footballer
 Charles Nollet (1865–1941), French general and government minister 
 Estelle Nollet (born 1977), French author
 Floris Nollet (1794-1853), Belgian physicist, engineer, and inventor
 Isidore Charles Nollet (1898–1988), American-Canadian rancher and politician
 Jean-Antoine Nollet (1700–1770), French priest and physicist